Ariana Betzabé Lomas Polo (born 17 January 2002) is an Ecuadorian professional footballer who plays as a defender for Independiente del Valle and the Ecuador women's national team.

Club career
Lomas has played for Espuce FC, USFQ Dragonas and El Nacional in Ecuador.

International career
Lomas made her senior debut for Ecuador on 27 November 2020.

References

2002 births
Living people
Ecuadorian women's footballers
Women's association football defenders
C.D. El Nacional Femenino players
Esporte Clube Bahia players
C.S.D. Independiente del Valle footballers
Campeonato Brasileiro de Futebol Feminino Série A1 players
Ecuador women's international footballers
Ecuadorian expatriate footballers
Ecuadorian expatriate sportspeople in Brazil
Expatriate women's footballers in Brazil
21st-century Ecuadorian women